Myasoyedovo is a rural locality (a selo) and the administrative center of Belovskoye Rural Settlement, Belgorodsky District, Belgorod Oblast, Russia. The population was 464 as of 2010. There are eight streets.

Geography 
Myasoyedovo is located 35 km northeast of Maysky (the district's administrative centre) by road. Sevryukovo is the nearest rural locality.

References 

Rural localities in Belgorodsky District
Belgorodsky Uyezd